Cinysca arlequin is a species of sea snail, a marine gastropod mollusk in the family Areneidae.

Description

Distribution

References

Areneidae
Gastropods described in 2002